Volema paradisiaca, common name : the Pear Melongena, is a species of sea snail, a marine gastropod mollusk in the family Melongenidae, the crown conches and their allies. This species may be a synonym of Volema pyrum.

Description
The size of the adult shell varies between 40 mm and 52 mm.
The shell is cream-colored (with top of the spire being darker) and somewhat pear-shaped, and is mostly smooth with faint ridges on the lower half of the body whorl. The shell of Volema paradisiaca lacks any knobs or spines.

Distribution
This species occurs in the Indian Ocean off Madagascar, Mozambique and Tanzania; in the Singapore Strait.

References

 Spry, J.F. (1961). The sea shells of Dar es Salaam: Gastropods. Tanganyika Notes and Records 56
 Richmond, M. (Ed.) (1997). A guide to the seashores of Eastern Africa and the Western Indian Ocean islands. Sida/Department for Research Cooperation, SAREC: Stockholm, Sweden. . 448 pp.

External links
 

Melongenidae
Gastropods described in 1798